Lovers in the Year One is a 1973 Czechoslovakian drama film directed by Jaroslav Balík. It was selected as the Czechoslovakian entry for the Best Foreign Language Film at the 47th Academy Awards, but was not accepted as a nominee.

Cast
 Marta Vančurová as Helena Poláková
 Viktor Preiss as Pavel Krouza
 Libuše Švormová as Olga
 Petr Svojtka as Evžen
 Jana Švandová as Jana
 Ota Sklenčka as Režisér
 Bedřich Prokoš as Professor
 Jiří Kodet as Assistant
 Jan Teplý as Mladík
 Naďa Konvalinková as Jarmila
 Jitka Smutná as Zdena
 Jitka Zelenohorská as Jitka
 Zuzana Geislerová as Věra

See also
 List of submissions to the 47th Academy Awards for Best Foreign Language Film
 List of Czechoslovak submissions for the Academy Award for Best Foreign Language Film

References

External links
 

1973 films
Czechoslovak drama films
1970s Czech-language films
1973 drama films
Films directed by Jaroslav Balík
Czech drama films
1970s Czech films